The 2001 Dallas Cowboys season was the team's 42nd in the National Football League. The Cowboys matched their record from the season before, going 5–11 and missing the playoffs, finishing last in the NFC East. For the first time since 1988, Troy Aikman was not on the Cowboys roster as quarterback, as the three-time Super Bowl champion retired, after playing for the team from 1989 to 2000. For the first time, Pat Summerall and John Madden did not call any Cowboys games for FOX all year.

Offseason 

An eventful off-season created a lot buzz but little change in the Cowboys' fortunes. Franchise quarterback Troy Aikman, after suffering a pair of concussions the previous season, was released by the team. Unable to sign on with another team — in part due to his long history of concussions — Aikman announced his retirement at an emotional and lengthy press conference later in the off-season. This left running back Emmitt Smith as the last of the famed "triplets" from the Cowboys' Super Bowl victories. Veteran quarterback Tony Banks was signed in the off-season from the Super Bowl champion Baltimore Ravens as an immediate replacement, and owner Jerry Jones hand picked Georgia quarterback Quincy Carter with a second-round draft choice as the quarterback of the future. Many saw the Carter pick as quite a reach considering Carter's inconsistent career at Georgia and his low draft rating by several other teams.

2001 draft class 

Notes
 The Cowboys traded their 2000 first-round (No. 19 overall) and 2001 first-round (No. 7 overall) selections to the Seattle Seahawks in exchange for wide receiver Joey Galloway.
 The Cowboys traded their original second-round selection (No. 37 overall) to the Indianapolis Colts in exchange for second- (No. 52 overall) and third-round (No. 81 overall) selections.
 The Cowboys traded their second-round (No. 52 overall, from Indianapolis) selection to the Miami Dolphins in exchange for second (No. 56 overall) and fourth-round (No. 122 overall) selections.
 The Cowboys traded two third-round (Nos. 70 and 81 overall) selections to the New Orleans Saints in exchange for a second-round (No. 53 overall) selection.
 The Cowboys traded their fourth-round (No. 102 overall) and 2002 seventh-round (No. 217 overall) selections to the Atlanta Falcons in exchange for tight end O.J. Santiago.

Undrafted free agents

Roster

Coaching staff

Regular season 
Despite what seemed a promising outing in the first pre-season game by starter Tony Banks, the Cowboys, in a very surprising move, released Banks in the middle of training camp and handed the reins over to their rookie quarterback. Unfortunately, a combination of injuries and ineffectiveness led to the Cowboys starting a total of four different quarterbacks over the course of the season, including journeyman Anthony Wright and former Arkansas Razorback Clint Stoerner. In an attempt to provide more depth at the quarterback position, the team signed former second-overall draft pick Ryan Leaf mid-season, however he provided no improvement in his limited playing time. His only start of the season, a Week 9 loss to the Falcons, was the final start of his career. The game also marked the first start for Falcons QB Michael Vick.

Even with the injection of new blood, the Cowboys suffered through another 5–11 campaign and a last place finish in the NFC East. The lack of development at quarterback and the offense as a whole would be blamed on offensive coordinator Jack Reilly who was dismissed after the season. Fans became weary of the Cowboys' performance and blamed owner Jerry Jones, who by now had taken a more hands-on approach to running the team.

One notable game included week 7, where the Cowboys led the Giants 24–7 at halftime, but (thanks in part to Clint Stoerner's 4 interceptions) the Giants rallied to win in overtime. In an unusual move, Stoerner was pulled from the game for Ryan Leaf late in the 4th quarter of a tie game. It was Leaf's debut with the team, but he couldn't lead them to victory.

Another infamous game was on Thanksgiving Day against the Broncos. Dallas trailed 26–10 and scored a touchdown in the 4th quarter. Coach Dave Campo decided against "going for 2" which if successful would have made it an eight-point (and one-possession) game. Campo instead had Dallas kick the extra point, keeping the margin at 9. Dallas did score one more late TD but that was not enough to tie the game and they never got the ball back, and lost 26–24.

A fourth consecutive season sweep of rival Washington Redskins and a victory over the San Francisco 49ers were the only victories of note. Much of the focus turned towards Emmitt Smith and his pursuit of the all-time career rushing yardage record. During an early-season game against the San Diego Chargers, Bob Hayes was inducted into the Cowboys Ring of Honor.

Schedule 

Note: Intra-division opponents are in bold text.

Standings

References

Publications 
 The Football Encyclopedia 
 Total Football 
 Cowboys Have Always Been My Heroes

External links 
 
 Pro Football Hall of Fame
 Dallas Cowboys Official Site

Dallas Cowboys seasons
Dallas
Dallas